Eupithecia microleuca is a moth in the  family Geometridae. It is found in Mexico.

References

Moths described in 1918
microleuca
Moths of Central America